George Hull Bowers was Dean of Manchester in the mid part of the 19th century.

Born in Staffordshire in  1794, he was educated at Clare College, Cambridge and ordained in 1819. He began his ecclesiastical career at Elstow after which he was  Rector of St Paul's, Covent Garden followed by a 25-year spell in Manchester. He died on 27 December 1872.

Notes

1794 births
Clergy from Staffordshire
Alumni of Clare College, Cambridge
Deans of Manchester
1872 deaths